Kurt Laurenz Metzler (born 26 January 1941), Signature "KLM", is a Swiss sculptor. His artworks adorned many Swiss cities, mostly in public places.

Life 

Metzler was born 1941 in Balgach, St. Gallen. In School, Metzler already was working creatively, using pieces of wood and cardboard. He wanted to become an artist. Because he lost his father, he temporarily grew up at his uncle’s,  Florian Metzler, who was a painter.

Because Metzler’s Mother said, sculptor was an unstable business, he began to be an architectural draftsman, decorator and photographer.

In 1958, he enrolled himself to the „Schule für Gestaltung“, an artistic school of Zurich
He got his sculptor’s diploma in 1963. In 1964 he travelled to the United States and lived in New York City for a year.

Back in Switzerland, he made an apprenticeship at a car body tinsmith’s to learn the art of blacksmithing. Then he worked for other sculptors, e.g. Ödön Koch, Arnold D’Altri, Paul Speck or Silvio Mattioli.
 
In 1970, he bought a house in Tremona (Canton of Ticino, Switzerland). There, his first big sculpture were made. During these times, Metzler got his first orders and had multiple exhibitions.

Another voyage through the USA followed. In 1976, he took part at the “International Sculptors Congress“ in New Orleans.

In 1989 he opened up an atelier in Tillson, New York City, where he created works for exhibitions in New York and Long Island. He went to Italy, where he started to work  and live in Iesa near Siena, with Claudia, his wife, and his two sons. Today, he lives in the Toscana and in Zurich.

The garden around his property is now populated with about 50 characters and is also like the garden of Daniel Spoerri and the Tarot Garden by Niki de Saint Phalle, an Artists' Garden in Tuscany, which became known as Arte Ambientale.

From this period are numerous monumental works in public spaces. The sculptures are located in Australia, Germany and the United States.

1996 Metzler has exhibited in the Baths of Caracalla, in 1997 in Sienna and in 2003 in Milan. In 2006, a selection of his works at the Park Hotel on the Bürgenstock was seen at Lake Lucerne too. In the same year he participated in the 3rd Swiss Sculpture Triennale in Bad Ragaz and Vaduz, for which he was the technical director, and where he also took part in the first 2 shows.

In 2007, several sculptural works in the context of the Ansbacher Metzler Sculpture Mile in the public space in Ansbach were visible.

From July to October he took part in the:"Bella Estate Dell'Arte of Milan", showing a traveling exhibition "Nevrotici Metropolitani" at the Milan Central Station square. The exhibition was curated by art critic Vittorio Sgarbi and praised by Milan mayor Letizia Moratti.

A book with many essays by Vittorio Sgarbi, Alberto Bartalini & Franz Jaeger, with photo documentation by Mario Mulas brother of the late art photographer Ugo Mulas, about the "Nevrotici Metropolitani" traveling exhibition was published 2008-2009.

Christmas 2009, Metzler, has collocated his touring exhibition "Nevrotici Metropolitani" into the "Piazza Basilica Inferiore" in Assisi.

In July 2009 in collaboration with Gallery Belvedere Singapore, he designed the sculpture group "Urban People" an exciting and iconic public art installation in the heart of Orchard Road, in front of the ION Orchard and The Orchard Residences in Singapore.

End of summer he participated at the Concert For Viareggio as the only sculptor, with 5 of his works beneath the stage. The idea came from Zucchero "Sugar" Fornaciari, the headliner of the evening along with many other artists and celebrities from the worlds of sport and entertainment.

In occasion of the Teatro del Silenzio, the worldwide famous  Andrea Bocelli concert, which took place on 25 July 2010, he created the stunning 14-metre monumental sculpture of a modernistic star as well as the metallic human figures in bright crayola colors that peopled the stone walls of the openair theatre, and also graced the rooftops and piazza in Lajatico.

Style

His opinionated sculptures are made of materials that are heavy, but seem to be light when seen in the definitive work (Marble, Bronze, Iron, Aluminium). Sometimes, the materials are bare, but often they are painted unicolored with a rather violent color.

The elder motives are wire dancers, people who are man and motor united (they e.g. contain motor parts or chains). Newer are the motives Zeitungsleser (Newspaper), Stadtneurotiker (City-neurotics),Cities, Golf players or giant people.

Select works
«Gespräch», Ulmbergtunnel, Zürich, 1973
«Stabhochspringer», Uster, 1974
«Züri-Familie», Bahnhofstrasse, Zürich, 1978–79
«Gespräch in Bewegung», Überlandstrasse, Zürich
Figurengruppe aus Aluminium, Spreitenbach, 1993-94.
Building People, Capital Tower, Singapore
Urban People, ION Orchard, Singapore
Men On Bench, Capital Tower Plaza, Singapore

External links 
 , official website
 , Milan Photogallery

Swiss artists
1941 births
Living people